Gong Wusheng (born August 1956) is a former Chinese politician who served as party secretary of Loudi from 2011 to 2016, and mayor of Yongzhou from 2005 to 2011.  As of May 2020, he was under investigation by China's top anti-corruption agency. Gong crossed paths with and was known to be a close ally of Qin Guangrong. He was a delegate to the 11th National People's Congress.

Biography
Gong was born in Xintian County, Hunan, in August 1956. During the late Cultural Revolution, in April 1975, he became a sent-down youth in his home-county. After graduating from Lingling Normal School (now Hunan University of Science and Engineering) in 1980, he stayed at the school and worked in its Communist Youth League. 

He joined the Communist Party of China (CPC) in March 1981. In 1983, he was appointed deputy secretary of Lingling (now Yongzhou) Prefectural Party Committee of the Communist Youth League, working as a deputy to Qin Guangrong. In December 1987, he was despatched to Shuangpai County and made secretary of Commission for Discipline Inspection, the party's agency in charge of anti-corruption efforts. He was admitted to member of the standing committee of the CPC Shuangpai County Committee, the county's top authority. He was assigned to the similar position in Dao County in December 1989. In August 1992, Qin Guangrong, the then party secretary of Lingling, promoted him to become party secretary of Dao County, the top political position in the county. In March 1997, he became secretary-general of CPC Yongzhou Municipal Committee. In December 2005, he was named acting mayor of Yongzhou, succeeding Liu Aicai. He was installed as mayor in February 2006, his first foray into a regional leadership role. In December 2011, he was reassigned to Loudi and rose to become party secretary. It would be his first job as "first-in-charge" of a prefecture-level city. In March 2016, he took office of deputy secretary-general of CPC Hunan Provincial Committee and vice chairperson of the Hunan People's Congress Agriculture and Rural Affairs Committee, and served until his retirement in January 2018.

Downfall
On 9 May 2020, he was put under investigation for alleged "serious violations of discipline and laws" by the Central Commission for Discipline Inspection (CCDI), the party's internal disciplinary body, and the National Supervisory Commission, the highest anti-corruption agency of China. One month later, his successor Li Jianguo was also placed under investigation for "serious violations of discipline and laws". Four consecutive party secretaries of Dao County, Gong Wusheng, Gao Jianhua, Yi Guangming and Tang Xianglin, were sacked for graft one after another. On November 2, he was expelled from the Communist Party. On November 18, he was detained by the Henan Provincial People's Procuratorate. On December 18, he was indicted on suspicion of accepting bribes.

References

1956 births
Living people
People from Xintian County
Hunan University of Science and Engineering alumni
Mayors of Yongzhou
People's Republic of China politicians from Hunan
Chinese Communist Party politicians from Hunan
Delegates to the 11th National People's Congress